Eshgin Guliyev (born 11 December 1990) is an Azerbaijani football midfielder who plays for Shuvalan in the Azerbaijan First Division.

Playing career 

Guliyev played for Neftchi Baku in the 2008 UEFA Intertoto Cup.

He has appeared in four matches for the Azerbaijan national under-21 football team, including qualifiers for the 2009 U-21 Championship.

In the match against Albania, on 5 September 2009, he scored an own goal, which ended up deciding the match, as Azerbaijan lost 1–0.

Guliyev held the number 23 shirt in 2008, until the following season when he was awarded the number 6.

References

External links 
Profile on Neftchi Baku Official Site

Azerbaijani footballers
Association football midfielders
1990 births
Living people
Sumgayit FK players
AZAL PFK players
People from Gardabani
Neftçi PFK players
Azerbaijan youth international footballers
Azerbaijan under-21 international footballers
Azerbaijan international footballers